The Norway men's national basketball team represents Norway in international basketball tournaments. The national team is administered by the Norwegian Basketball Federation.

Norway has never had great success on the international stage in the past. They are one of the few European countries to date to have never qualified for one of the top international basketball competitions, such as the EuroBasket or the FIBA World Cup.

History
Norway's first international match was played on 11 February 1967 in Oslo, where the team lost 50–63 to Denmark. The most capped player is Torgeir Bryn, with 111 caps.

In the past, Norway has attempted to qualify for the EuroBasket several times, but have yet to reach the tournament. They have only entered the Olympic basketball qualification twice, for the 1980, and 1988 Olympic Games. Norway is one of Europe's most populous nations to have never qualified for a major international basketball competition. However, they have competed at smaller events such as the European Championship for Small Countries.

The Road to Revival (2012–2017)
In 2012, financial troubles led the Norwegian Basketball Federation to shut down both the men's and women's national teams. The federation simply did not have the funds to keep either the men's or women's teams afloat. Since then, however, the federation has come to realize just how many people from the athletes and teams, to individuals and companies care about the Norwegian basketball community and are willing to provide financial support. The federation also worked to raise money through sponsorships, and eventually signed a major sponsorship agreement with Circle K, in addition to a few smaller sponsors.

Norway's return (2018–present)
In 2018, Norway made its return to FIBA competition by playing at the European Championship for Small Countries. The national team finished as the runners-up after losing 75–59 in the final against Malta.

In 2021, Norway joined the EuroBasket 2025 qualification.

Competitive record

FIBA World Cup

Olympic Games

Championship for Small Countries

EuroBasket

Results and fixtures

2021

2022

2023

Team

Current roster
Roster for the EuroBasket 2025 Pre-Qualifiers matches on 23 and 26 February 2023 against Denmark and North Macedonia.

Depth chart

Head coach position
 Matthias Eckhoff – (2018–present)

Notable players
 Torgeir Bryn – the first Scandinavian, and the only Norwegian who has played in the NBA; and the most capped player for the Norway national basketball team with 111 matches.

Past rosters
2018 FIBA European Championship for Small Countries: finished 2nd  among 7 teams

See also

Norway women's national basketball team
Norway men's national under-20 basketball team
Norway men's national under-18 basketball team
Norway men's national under-16 basketball team

References

External links
Official website 
Norway FIBA profile
Norway National Team – Men at Eurobasket.com

Men's national basketball teams
Basketball in Norway
Basket
1968 establishments in Norway